Nozawa Bar is a Michelin Guide-starred Japanese restaurant in Beverly Hills, California.

See also 
 List of Japanese restaurants

References 

Culture of Beverly Hills, California
Japanese restaurants in California
Michelin Guide starred restaurants in California